The Latin Catholic archdiocese of Nicosia was created during the Crusades (1095-1487) in Cyprus; later becoming titular. According to the Catholic Encyclopedia 31 Latin archbishops served beginning in 1196, shortly after the conquest of Cyprus by Richard I of England, to 1502.

List of archbishops

Resident
1196–1202 Alan
1206–1210/11 Thierry
1211 Durand
1217–1250 Eustorge de Montaigu
1251–1261 Ugo di Fagiano
1262 Giovanni Colonna
1267 Giles
1268 Jean d'Angoulême
1270–1273 Bertrand Bernardi
1278–1286 Ranulf
1280s Raphael
1288–1296 John of Ancona
1296–1303 Gérard de Langres
1303–? Henri de Gibelet (apostolic administrator)
1306–? Tommaso de Muro (apostolic administrator)
1308–? Pierre Erlant (apostolic administrator)
1311–? Pierre de Brie (apostolic administrator)
1312-1332 Giovanni Conti
1332–1342 
1344–1361 
1361–1376 Raymond of Pradella
1376–1382 Béranger Grégoire
During the Western Schism:
Avignon obedience
1383–1406 Andrea Michelis
1411–1421 Hugh of Lusignan (apostolic administrator)
Roman obedience
1382/3– Luchino
1395–1402 
1402–1412 
1421–1442 Hugh of Lusignan
1442–1447 Galesius of Montolif
1447 Giovanni Moreli
1447–1451 Andreas Chrysoberges
1456–1457 James of Cyprus (elect)
1456–1463 Isidore of Kiev (apostolic administrator)
1467–1469 Nicola Guglielmo Goner
1471–1476 Louis Fenollet
1476 Giovanni Francesco Brusato
1477–1438/4 Vittore Marcello
1484–1495 Benedetto Superanzio (or Soranzo)
1495 Domenico Grimani (apostolic administrator)
1495–1502 Sebastiano Priuli
1502–1524 
1524–1552 Livio Podocathor
1552–1557 Cesare Podocathor
1560–1586 Filippo Mocenigo

Titular

1728 Raniero Felice Simonetti
Carlo Vittorio Amedeo delle Lanze
1818–1826 Antonio Fernando Echanove Zaldívar
1915 Francesco Cherubini
1934 Guglielmo Piani

Notes

 
Catholic Archdiocese of Nicosia
Catholic Church in Cyprus